The 1969 Clemson Tigers football team was an American football team that represented Clemson University in the Atlantic Coast Conference (ACC) during the 1969 NCAA University Division football season. In its 30th and final season under head coach Frank Howard, the team compiled a 4–6 record (3–3 against conference opponents), tied for third place in the ACC, and was outscored by a total of 250 to 178. The team played its home games at Memorial Stadium in Clemson, South Carolina.

Frank Howard retired as head coach after the 1969 season, although he remained athletic director until 1971.  In 1974, the playing field at Memorial Stadium, which he helped to build, was named in his honor.

Defensive end Ivan Southerland and running back Charlie Tolley were the team captains. The team's statistical leaders included quarterback Tommy Kendrick with 1,457 passing yards, running back Ray Yauger with 968 rushing yards and 66 points (11 touchdowns), and end Charlie Waters with 738 receiving yards.

Three Clemson players were selected by the Associated Press as first-team players on the 1969 All-Atlantic Coast Conference football team: Ray Yauger; Charlie Waters; and Ivan Southerland.

Schedule

References

Clemson
Clemson Tigers football seasons
Clemson Tigers football